Rotana Music Group is the Arab world's largest record label. It is owned by the Rotana Group, established by the Nagro Brothers, Mohammed, Khalid, Waleed, Ahmed and Nezar Nagro later sold to the Saudi prince Al Waleed bin Talal, who sometimes personally signs artists to the label. Rotana Records is part of a media empire that includes a film production company, a magazine of the same name, a record label, and seven music channels. More than 100 artists are signed to Rotana.

During the 1990s and 2000s, the label was distributed by EMI Arabia. In February 2021, Warner Music Group purchased a minority stake in Rotana.

Notable artists

Current  
 Ahlam
 Amal Maher
 Angham
 Arwa
 Asalah
 Asma Lamnawar
 Dalia Mubarak
 Diana Haddad
 George Wassouf
 Jamilla
 Jannat
 Maher Zain
 Majid Al Muhandis
 Mesut Kurtis
 Mohamed Ramadan
 Najwa Karam
 Nawal El Kuwaiti
 Nawal Al Zoghbi
 Randa Hafez
 Shatha Hassoun
 Shayma Helali
 Sherine
 Tamer Hosny
 Waed

Previous 

 Abdallah Al Rowaished
 Amal Hijazi
 Amr Diab
 Aseel Omran
 Ayman Alatar
 Balqees Ahmed Fathi
 Bashar Al Shatty
 Bassima
 Carole Samaha 
 Cyrine Abdelnour
 Dina Hayek
 Elissa
 Fadel Shaker
 Fares Karam
 Fulla
 Grace Deeb
 Hatem Al Iraqi
 Haifa Wehbe
 Hind
 Hoda Saad
 Hussain Al Jassmi
 Kadim Al Sahir
 Latifa
 Mai Selim
 Maritta Hallani
 Marwan Khoury
 Maya Nasri
 Melhem Zein
 Mohamed Mounir
 Pascale Machaalani
 Rajaa Kasbani
 Ramy Ayach
 Rida Al Abdullah
 Saber Rebaï
 Samira Said
 Sherine Wagdy
 Suzanne Tamim 
 Tamer Ashour
 The 4 Cats
 Thekra 
 Wael Kfoury
 Walid Toufic
 Yasmine Niazy
 ZeeZee

See also 
 List of record labels

References

External links
 

Rotana Group
Arab record labels
Saudi Arabian record labels
Record labels established in 1987
1987 establishments in Saudi Arabia
Cinema of Saudi Arabia
IFPI members
EMI
Sony Music
Universal Music Group
Warner Music Group